Douglas John Moray Stuart, 20th Earl of Moray (13 February 1928 – 23 September 2011) was a Scottish peer, styled Lord Doune until 1974. The son of Archibald Stuart, 19th Earl of Moray, he succeeded to the earldom of Moray on his father's death in 1974. He lost his seat in the House of Lords after the reforms of the House of Lords Act 1999.

In 1984, the Moray placed Doune Castle, which had been held by the family since 1570, into the care of the nation. It is now looked after by Historic Scotland.

He married Lady Malvina Dorothea Murray, daughter of Mungo Murray, 7th Earl of Mansfield and Mansfield, and Dorothea Carnegie, on 27 January 1964. They had two children:
 John Douglas Stuart, 21st Earl of Moray (born 29 August 1966); married Catherine Lawson, has issue including heir apparent James Stuart, Lord Doune (b. 2002)
 Lady Louisa Helena Stuart (born 18 August 1968); married David Howitt, has issue

The Dowager Countess and her daughter Lady Louisa Howitt (née Stuart) are Patronesses of the Royal Caledonian Ball.

Car collection

Lord Doune's car collection began in 1953 and by 1970 it was decided to open the collection to the public as the Doune Motor Museum. This linked in turn to one of the world's steepest races: The Doune Hill Climb, a timed event. His collection included:

Three Stroke Rolls-Royce (1905) the only remaining example in the world
Sunbeam 3 litre (1913)
Citroen 5CV (1923)
Hispano-Suiza 37 hp (1924)
Bentley Speed Six 6.5 litre (1929)
Bentley 8 litre (1930)
Lanchester Coupe (1932)
Invicta 4.5 litre (1933)
Hispano-Suiza Ballot (1934)
Aston Martin Le Mans (1934)
Riley Nine Lincock (1934)
Bugatti 57C (1938)
BMW 328 (1938)
Rolls-Royce Phantom Continental (1935)
Jaguar SS 100 (1937)
Lagonda V12 (1937)
Nardi Danese (1947)
Morgan Plus Four (1951)
Jaguar XK120 (1951)
Daimler Conquest Roadster (1956)
Iso Grifo (1968)
Ford GT40 (1965)
Volvo P1800S (1966)
Ferrari Dino (1973)

The museum closed on 30 November 1998.

References

External links

1928 births
2011 deaths
Earls of Moray

Moray